Molly Gibson is an American girl widely known for being frozen as an embryo since October 14, 1992 for 27 years before she was born on October 26, 2020. She holds the world's record for the longest-frozen embryo to ever come to birth.

Background 
After being donated by a couple in 1992, Molly was frozen and placed in a cryogenic freezer. The embryo was thawed and transferred to the uterus of 28-year-old Tina Gibson in February 2020. Tina, born in April 1991, was barely 2 years old when the original couple donated Molly's embryo to a clinic in the Midwest. The couple had earlier adopted the embryo of Emma, a 24-year-old embryo which was the oldest human embryo in history to have been born, until Molly.

References 

Living people
People from Tennessee
2020 births